Gabriel de Mendizábal Iraeta "Primer Conde de Cuadro de Alba de Tormes" (14 May 1765, in Bergara, Gipuzkoa – 1 September 1838, in Madrid) was a Spanish general officer who fought in the Peninsular War. He is known for his command of Spanish forces during the Battle of the Gebora. Mendizábal rose through the ranks of the Spanish army, and was not of noble birth.

Military career 

He began(?) his military career as a sergeant major and saw his first action during the War of the Pyrenees. Throughout the war, Mendizábal fought on both the Basque-Navarrese and Catalan fronts.

In 1793, he was promoted to the rank of Colonel and was given command of a newly created regiment, the Voluntarios de Burgos posted in the north of Portugal. Due to the Spanish military disaster occurring at Irún at the end of the Battle of the Baztan Valley in 1794, he was transferred to western Gipuzkoa with the inferior rank of First Comandante by order of a military council. On 2 December 1794, he commanded a joint Álavan, Gipuzkoan and Biscayan militia to achieve an unlikely victory in his own home town Bergara over French troops.

In 1802, Mendizábal was again promoted to the rank of Colonel, and was given the command of a regiment of volunteers from Navarre.  On 23 September 1804, he entered the city of Bilbao at the head of his troops to put an end to a series of riots collectively known as the Zamacolada.

In 1809, at the start of the Peninsular War, Mendizábal was promoted to mariscal de campo, a rank equivalent to major general.  Later that year, he was granted the noble title of a Count, officially "Conde de Cuadro de Alba de Tormes", for his military achievements against the French cavalry.  In 1810, he continued his rise up the ladder and was promoted to the rank of Lieutenant General.

He was named commander of the Army of the Left and suffered a serious defeat at the Battle of the Gebora after which he was kept from command. Utterly humiliated, Mendizábal begged to serve as a simple rank and file soldier, a request that was granted.  After distinguishing himself at the Battle of Albuera in May 1811, he was reinstated by the courts with the title of Commander of the Seventh Army or "Séptimo Exército" which he took to the north of Spain in the territories that make up the Basque Provinces (Biscay), Navarre, La Rioja, Burgos, and Santander.  He fought in this mountainous region using guerrilla tactics.

On 16 December 1812, Mendizábal was named political chief of the Seigneury of Biscay. He called the acting Council of Biscay, who in the wake of the approval of a new Constitution in Cádiz sent a task force to the city with a negotiation mandate. In the final phases of the war, on 31 August 1813, he controlled one of the divisions in the bloody but definitive Battle of San Marcial. For his actions, he was decorated with the highest military honors of the Laureate Cross of Saint Ferdinand, and the Laureate of the Royal and Military Order of Saint Hermenegild.

Post-war career and death 

Between 1814 and 1820, he gained significant political power as a member of the Consejo Supremo de la Guerra.  In 1834, he was named president of the Tribunal Supremo de Guerra y Marina, a position he kept until his death four years later in 1838.

References 

1765 births
1838 deaths
Spanish generals
Spanish commanders of the Napoleonic Wars
Military leaders of the French Revolutionary Wars
Counts of Spain
Laureate Cross of Saint Ferdinand
Grand Crosses of the Royal and Military Order of San Hermenegild
People from Bergara